Paderu Assembly constituency is an ST reserved constituency in Alluri Sitharama Raju district of Andhra Pradesh, representing the state legislative assembly in India. It is one of the seven assembly segments of Araku (ST) (Lok Sabha constituency), along with Kurupam (ST), Palakonda, Salur, Araku Valley (ST) and Rampachodavaram. Bhagya Lakshmi Kottagulli is the present MLA of the constituency, who won the 2019 Andhra Pradesh Legislative Assembly election from YSR Congress Party. , there are a total of 227,042 electors in the constituency.

Mandals 
The five mandals that form the assembly constituency are:

Members of Legislative Assembly Chintapalli

Members of Legislative Assembly Gudem

Members of Legislative Assembly Paderu

Election results

Assembly Elections 2004

Assembly Elections 2009

Assembly elections 2014

Assembly elections 2019

See also 
 List of constituencies of the Andhra Pradesh Legislative Assembly

References 

Assembly constituencies of Andhra Pradesh